Buddusò (Gallurese: Buddusò) is a comune (municipality) in the Province of Sassari in the Italian region Sardinia, located about  north of Cagliari and about  southwest of Olbia.

Buddusò borders the following municipalities: Alà dei Sardi, Bitti, Oschiri, Osidda, Pattada.

References

Cities and towns in Sardinia